Fazliddin Hasanbaevich Gaibnazarov (born 16 June 1991) is an Uzbek professional boxer currently fighting at welterweight. As an amateur fighting at light welterweight, in 2015 he earned silver medals at the world and Asian championships, and in 2016 won a gold medal at the Rio Olympics.

Amateur career

2012 Olympics
In the round of 32, Gaibnazarov defeated Yhyacinthe Mewoli Abdon 11–6.  He then beat Jose Ramírez 15–11 in the round of 16.  He lost in the quarterfinals to eventual silver medalist Han Soon-Chul 13–16.

2016 Olympics
Gaibnazarov won the gold medal in the 2016 Rio Olympics in the light welterweight division. He defeated Dival Malonga of the Republic of Congo in the round of 32, Manoj Kumar of India in the round of 16, Gary Antuanne Russell of the United States in the quarterfinals, Vitaly Dunaytsev of Russia in the semifinals, and finally Lorenzo Sotomayor Collazo of Azerbaijan in the finals to win the gold medal.

Professional career 

Gaibnazarov turned professional at the age of 25 when he signed with Top Rank on 17 March 2017 on a multi-year deal. Gaibnazarov, speaking to ESPN, praised Top Rank saying, "Top Rank is the best promotional company in the world, and I always want to be with the best. Thank you, Top Rank, and especially Bob Arum, for giving me this opportunity and letting me show and prove in the ring my ability to fight as a professional."

Top Rank's vice president Carl Moretti announced that Gaibnazarov would make his debut as a lightweight at the StubHub Center in Carson, California on 22 April in an 8-round bout. On his debut, he fought Victor Vazquez (7-2, 3 KOs). Gaibnazarov was dropped in the opening round after just 20 seconds. He recovered well and stopped Vazquez after 1 minute, 28 seconds of round 2. Speaking to a translator, he said, "I was a little bit hurried in the first round because it was my debut. I was maybe nervous and didn't feel comfortable. After I came to the corner, my trainers told me what to do and I followed their instructions, and you see how it came out." It was the first time Gaibnazarov had been dropped in his entire boxing career. Gaibnazarov's next fight took place 29 days later on the Terence Crawford vs. Félix Díaz undercard at Madison Square Garden in New York City against Agustine Mauras. Gaibnazarov was taken the full 8 round distance, winning on all three judges' scorecards (80-72). He threw straight lefts and right hooks throughout the 8 rounds. Gaibnazarov next appeared at the Convention Center in Tucson, Arizona on 22 September 2017 against Mexican boxer Victor Rosas (9-6, 3 KOs). Gaibnazarov applied pressure, landing clean shots, however was unable to stop Rosas, winning the bout on all three scorecards 80–72 to remain undefeated. On 12 October it was announced that he would appear on the undercard of Vasyl Lomachenko vs. Guillermo Rigondeaux on 9 December at the Madison Square Garden Theater in New York City. Unbeaten lightweight prospect Steven Ortiz (7-0, 2 KOs) was confirmed as his opponent, however the fight did not take place. Gaibnazarov's next fight did take place on the undercard of Lomachenko, for his fight against Jorge Linares at the Madison Square Garden on 12 May 2018. His opponent was Mexican boxer Jesus Silveira. The fight ended in round 4 after Gaibnazarov dropped Silveira twice. The first knockdown came with a two-punch combination and the second came with a left hand, which he was landed clean most of the fight. The time of stoppage was 2 minutes, 5 seconds. He also became the first boxer to stop Silveira.

Professional boxing record

References

External links

 
 
 
 
 

Living people
Boxers at the 2012 Summer Olympics
Boxers at the 2016 Summer Olympics
Olympic boxers of Uzbekistan
Olympic gold medalists for Uzbekistan
Medalists at the 2016 Summer Olympics
Olympic medalists in boxing
1991 births
Uzbekistani male boxers
AIBA World Boxing Championships medalists
Universiade medalists in boxing
People from Tashkent Region
Universiade silver medalists for Uzbekistan
Light-welterweight boxers
Medalists at the 2013 Summer Universiade